The 2000 Soul Train Music Awards were held on March 4, 2000 at the Shrine Auditorium in Los Angeles, California. The show was hosted by Eric Benét, Lisa "Left Eye" Lopes, Tamia and Shemar Moore.

Special awards

Artist of the Decade for Extraordinary Artistic Achievements – Male
 Prince

Artist of the Decade for Extraordinary Artistic Achievements – Female
 Whitney Houston

Sammy Davis Jr. Award for Entertainer of the Year – Male
 DMX

Sammy Davis Jr. Award for Entertainer of the Year – Female
 Mary J. Blige

Winners and nominees
Winners are in bold text.

R&B/Soul or Rap Album of the Year
 R.Kelly – R.
 Mary J Blige – Mary
 DMX – Flesh of My Flesh, Blood of My Blood
 TLC – Fanmail

Best R&B/Soul Album – Male
 Ginuwine – 100% Ginuwine
 Eric Benét – A Day in the Life
 Donell Jones – Where I Wanna Be
 Brian McKnight – Back at One

Best R&B/Soul Album – Female
 Mary J. Blige – Mary
 Macy Gray – On How Life Is
 Whitney Houston – My Love Is Your Love
 Jennifer Lopez – On the 6

Best R&B/Soul Album – Group, Band, or Duo
 TLC – FanMail
 Destiny's Child – The Writing's on the Wall
 K-Ci & JoJo – It's Real
 Les Nubians – Princesses Nubiennes

Best R&B/Soul Single – Male
 Maxwell – "Fortunate"
 Ginuwine – "So Anxious"
 Donell Jones – "U Know What's Up"
 Brian McKnight – "Back at One"

Best R&B/Soul Single – Female
 Lauryn Hill – "Ex-Factor"
 Mariah Carey  – "Heartbreaker"
 Whitney Houston – "My Love Is Your Love"
 Chanté Moore – "Chanté's Got a Man"

Best R&B/Soul Single – Group, Band, or Duo
 TLC – "No Scrubs"
 Destiny's Child – "Bills, Bills, Bills"
 Dru Hill – "Beauty"
 Ideal – "Get Gone"

The Michael Jackson Award for Best R&B/Soul or Rap Music Video
 Busta Rhymes  – "What's It Gonna Be?!"
 Missy Elliott  – "Hot Boyz"
 Q-Tip – "Vivrant Thing"
 Will Smith – "Will 2K"

Best R&B/Soul or Rap New Artist
 Juvenile
 Eve
 Ideal
 Angie Stone

Best Gospel Album
 Dottie Peoples – God Can & God Will
 Dorothy Norwood – The Lord is a Wonder
 Richard Smallwood – Healing: Live in Detroit
 Vickie Winans – Live in Detroit, Vol. 2

Performers
 Sisqo – "Thong Song"
 Destiny's Child
 Q-Tip
 Juvenile, Mannie Fresh, Lil Wayne and B.G.
 Mary J. Blige – "Your Child"
 Donell Jones and Lisa "Left Eye" Lopes – "U Know What's Up"
 Blaque
 Ginuwine – "So Anxious"
 Eric Benét and Tamia – "Spend My Life with You"
 DMX
 Lil' Kim

Soul Train Music Awards, 2000
Soul Train Music Awards
Soul
Soul
Soul